Kerkez is a Slavic surname. It may refer to:

 Dušan Kerkez (basketball) (born 1952), Serbian basketball player
 Dušan Kerkez (born 1976), Bosnian football manager and former midfielder
 Vladimir Kerkez (born 1984), Slovenian cyclist
 Dejan Kerkez (born 1996), Serbian football centre-back
 Strahinja Kerkez (born 2002), Cypriot football defender
 Milos Kerkez (born 2003), Hungarian football left-back